Apalevo is a rural locality (a village) in Gdovsky District of Pskov Oblast, Russia.

Rural localities in Pskov Oblast